Let's Play the Music of Thad Jones is an album by pianist Tommy Flanagan featuring compositions by Thad Jones recorded in 1993 for the Enja label.

Reception

AllMusic gave  the album 4½ stars with Scott Yanow's review stating: "Congratulations are due Tommy Flanagan for putting together a consistently swinging and tasteful salute to Thad Jones, a very talented composer".

Track listing
All compositions by Thad Jones.

 "Let's" – 5:32
 "Mean What You Say" – 5:39
 "To You" – 3:34
 "Bird Song" – 5:28
 "Scratch" – 5:23
 "Thadrack" – 4:38
 "A Child Is Born" – 6:19
 "Three in One" – 6:03
 "Quietude" – 5:12
 "Zec" – 3:50
 "Elusive" – 7:09

Personnel 
Tommy Flanagan – piano
Jesper Lundgaard – bass 
Lewis Nash – drums

References 

1993 albums
Tommy Flanagan albums
Enja Records albums